The Spheginobacchini is a tribe of hoverflies.

List of genera 
Spheginobaccha Meijere, 1908

References 

Eristalinae
Brachycera tribes